Leung Wing-ngan (born 6 December 1967), better known by her stage name Celine Ma Tai-lo, is a Hong Kong actress and singer. She is best known for her role as May May in the long running TVB television series A Kindred Spirit.

Career
Celine Ma had participated in the New Talent Singing Awards organised by TVB and Capital Artists. She also worked as a DJ at Commercial Radio Hong Kong, where she was in charge of the traffic bulletin, thus obtaining her stage name Ma Tai Lo (馬蹄露).

After entering TVB, she made her debut in A Kindred Spirit as May May, her most well known role. The episode where her character attempted suicide was the highest rated episode during the series' four-year run from 1995-1999. Celine was awarded Most Hated Television Character for her role in the 1997 TVB Anniversary Awards.

Celine Ma has remained as an active supporting actress in TVB. She has either played supporting roles or made guest appearances in numerous TVB dramas. Celine has also acted in several Hong Kong films.

Political attitudes

Since 2014, Ma has been known as a pro-government figure.

In July 2014, Ma openly opposed Umbrella Revolution and supported the police's use of violence against protesters.

On 5 July 2019, Ma described the protesters against the 2019 Hong Kong extradition bill as "rubbish". On 6 October 2019, Ma was involved in a physical altercation with a group of demonstrators while she was filming them damaging a Bank of China branch. She was then attacked by the protesters and required stitches on her chin and the back of her head. After being interviewed by an Australian reporter, she requested the reporter to escort her to the police for treatment, refusing first aid from the protesters saying she "doesn't trust [them] anymore."

Filmography

Television series

Film

References

1967 births
Living people
Hong Kong film actresses
Hong Kong television actresses
TVB actors
20th-century Hong Kong actresses
21st-century Hong Kong actresses